Dizoniopsis aspicienda is a species of sea snail, a gastropod in the family Cerithiopsidae, which is known from the Strait of Gibraltar. It was described by Bouchet, Gofas and Warén, in 2010.

References

Cerithiopsidae
Gastropods described in 2010